Douglas Van Steere (August 31, 1901 – February 6, 1995) was an American Quaker ecumenist.

Biography
He served as a professor of philosophy at Haverford College from 1928 to 1964 and visiting professor of theology at Union Theological Seminary from 1961 to 1962. Steere organized Quaker post-war relief work in Finland, Norway and Poland, was invited to participate as an ecumenical observer in the Second Vatican Council and co-founded the Ecumenical Institute of Spirituality. He authored, edited, translated and wrote introductions for many books on Quakerism, as well as other religions and philosophy.

Steere was an undergraduate at Michigan State University, received a Ph.D. from Harvard University in 1931, and was a Rhodes scholar at Oxford University, receiving degrees from Oxford in 1927 and 1954. He corresponded often with Thomas Merton, a popular Trappist monk.

In 1987, he was awarded the Decoration of Knight 1st Class of the White Rose of Finland, in recognition of his post-war relief work in that country.

Bibliography
Prayer and worship, 1938
On beginning from within, 1943
Doors into life, 1948
Purity of Heart, by Søren Kierkegaard, transl., 1938, 1948
Time to spare, 1949
On listening to another, 1955
Work and contemplation, 1957
Dimensions of prayer, 1962
Spiritual Counsel and Letters of Baron Friedrich von Hugel, Edited with an Introduction, 1964
God's irregular: Arthur Shearly Cripps: a Rhodesian epic 1973
Together in Solitude, 1982
Quaker Spirituality: Selected Writings, ed., preface by Elizabeth Gray Vining, 1983

References

Further reading
"The Open Life" – William Penn Lecture 1937 by Douglas V. Steere
Love at the Heart of Things: a biography of Douglas V. Steere, by E. Glenn Hinson. 1998

1901 births
1995 deaths
Haverford College faculty
Michigan State University alumni
Harvard University alumni
American Rhodes Scholars
American Quakers
People from Harbor Beach, Michigan
20th-century Quakers